Drew's Entertainment, also known as TUTM Entertainment, Inc., located in Greenbrook, New Jersey, is a record label company that produces sound-alike and cover versions of songs. Their music compilations have sold over 40 million copies since 1994.

The Hit Crew albums consist of cover songs; often the songs are "tributes" to artists, programmed around a theme to be used at a party, and theoretically allowing the host to play one album without having to create their own mix CD or act as a DJ.

Drew's Entertainment has had several placements in feature films, television ads, video games, and YouTube videos.

Company history
They began in 1994 as Turn Up The Music, Inc. and formerly had two labels — Drew's Famous Party Music and DJ's Choice — which were consolidated under the name Drew's Famous.  Song performances are usually credited to The Hit Crew, a name used by the company for their revolving group of session musicians.

Awards
Several releases have garnered awards.

Drew’s Famous: Party Music
RIAA Certified Gold
RIAA Certified Platinum

Drew’s Famous: Halloween Party Music
RIAA Certified Gold

DJ’s Choice: Kid Fun – Games, Songs & Sing-A-Longs
RIAA Certified Gold

Drew’s Famous: Ultimate Halloween Party Favorites
Sung by The Hit Crew, reached number 62 on Billboard 200 November 13, 2010.

Drew’s Famous: Ultimate Halloween Party Favorites
Sung by The Hit Crew, reached number 163 on The Billboard 200 October 30, 2010.

References

External links
 DrewsEnt — official site
 Drews Entertainment Catalog Search
 

American record labels
Companies based in Middlesex County, New Jersey
Edison, New Jersey
Sound-alike musical groups